Malta Boat Club is an amateur rowing club located at #9 Boathouse Row in the historic Boathouse Row of Philadelphia, Pennsylvania.  In 1865, the Club joined the Schuylkill Navy when it relocated to the Schuylkill River from the Delaware River and purchased the facilities of the now defunct Excelsior Club. While on the Delaware, the club occupied a house on Smith’s Island where the club stored its boat called the "Minnehaha". The club was founded by members of the Minnehaha Lodge of the Sons of Malta. The Sons of Malta, originally organized in the South, did not survive the Civil War.

As four members of the US National Team row out of Malta, the club was well represented at the 2009 World Championships.

The Boathouse
In 1873, Malta, in conjunction with Vesper Boat Club, built a -story boat house. In 1880, the boat house was expanded.

In 1901, brothers George W. and William D. Hewitt designed more substantial additions including a third story to make Malta the tallest boathouse on Boathouse Row. The Hewitt brothers had been Frank Furness's partner until 1876, and they designed the Bellevue-Stratford Hotel, the Bourse Building, and the Wissahickon Inn.

US National Team Athletes
1970s
Stan Depman
Fred H. Duling
Rick Stehlik

1980s

1990s
Fred S. Duling
Tom Loughlin
Marc Millard

2000s
Sam Cunningham
Shane Madden
Marc Millard
Rich Montgomery

2010s
Sam Cunningham
Bob Duff
Colin Ethridge
Christopher Lambert
Shane Madden
Tyler Nase
David Smith

Photo gallery

References

Further reading

External links

 Malta Boat Club on wikimapia.org

Rowing clubs in Philadelphia
National Register of Historic Places in Philadelphia
National Historic Landmarks in Pennsylvania
Buildings and structures in Philadelphia
Cultural infrastructure completed in 1873
Victorian architecture in Pennsylvania
Boathouse Row
Schuylkill Navy
Sports clubs established in 1860
1860 establishments in Pennsylvania
Philadelphia Register of Historic Places
Historic district contributing properties in Pennsylvania
Clubhouses on the National Register of Historic Places in Pennsylvania
Boathouses on the National Register of Historic Places in Pennsylvania